Romanian Jews in Israel refers to the community of Romanian Jews who migrated to Palestine beginning in the later 19th century, continued migrating to Israel after the formation of the modern state in 1948, and live within the state of Israel. The descendants of those who made aliyah in 1930s, the wave of emigrants after World War II or after the fall of communism, with their children and grandchildren born in Israel, represent about 10% of the population. According to the Association of Romanian Journalists Abroad, about 400,000 Romanian Jews live in Israel. They have established several kibbutzim, moshavim and towns (Kiryat Bialik, Kiryat Tiv'on, Rosh Pinna, Zikhron Ya'akov). Between 1882 and 1884, Romanian Jews in Israel already established nine localities.

History 
Mass emigration to Israel ensued (see Bricha and Aliyah). According to Sachar, for the first two post-war years, tens of thousands of Romanian Jews left for Israel; the Romanian government did not try to stop them, especially due to its desire to reduce its historically suspect and now impoverished Jewish minority. Afterwards, Jewish emigration began to encounter obstacles. In 1948, the year of Israeli independence, Zionism came under renewed suspicion, and the government began a campaign of liquidation against Zionist funds and training farms. However, emigration was not completely banned; Romanian Foreign Minister Ana Pauker, herself a Jew with a father and brother in Israel, negotiated an agreement with Israeli ambassador Reuven Rubin, a Romanian immigrant to Israel, under which the Romanian government would allow 4,000 Jews a month to emigrate to Israel; this decision was at least partially influenced by a large Jewish Agency bribe to the Romanian government. This agreement applied mainly to ruined businessmen and other economically "redundant" Jews. Around this time, Israel also secured another agreement with the Romanian government, under which Romania issued 100,000 exit visas for Jews and Israel supplied Romania with oil drills and pipes to aid the struggling Romanian oil industry. By December 1951, about 115,000 Romanian Jews had emigrated to Israel.

Throughout the period of Communist rule, Romania allowed limited numbers of Jews to emigrate to Israel, in exchange for much-needed Israeli economic aid. By 1965, Israel was funding agricultural and industrial projects throughout Romania, and in exchange, Romania allowed limited numbers of Jews to emigrate to Israel. When Nicolae Ceaușescu came to power in 1965, he initially ended the trade in deference to the Eastern bloc's Arab allies. However, by 1969, he decided to exchange Jews for cash from Israel. Ceaușescu wanted economic independence from the Soviet Union, which was content to keep Romania a backwater and as nothing more than a supplier of raw materials, but to fund economic projects, he needed hard cash. As a result, from then until the Ceaușescu regime fell in 1989, about 1,500 Jews a year were granted exit visas to Israel in exchange for a payment of cash for every Jew allowed to leave, in addition to other Israeli aid. The exact payments were determined by the age, education, profession, employment, and family status of the emigrant. Israel paid a minimum of $2,000 per head for every emigrant, and paid prices in the range of $25,000 for doctors or scientists. In addition to these payments, Israel also secured loans for Romania and paid off the interest itself, and supplied the Romanian Army with military equipment.

As a result of aliyah, the Romanian-Jewish community was gradually depleted. By 1987, just 23,000 Jews were left in Romania, half of whom were over 65 years old.

Relations with Romanian culture
Romanian Jews in Israel have strong relations with Romanian culture. Moreover, there is an intense activity among writers of Romanian language. In Israel exist 11 associations of writers in foreign languages, including the Association of Israeli Writers of Romanian Language. Likewise, there are publications in Romanian languages, weekly, monthly or quarterly, plus several local issues.

Romania has an embassy in Tel Aviv, three honorary consulates in Jerusalem, Beersheba and Haifa and a cultural institute in Tel Aviv.

Notable people 

This is a highly incomplete  list of Israeli people of Romanian Jewish descent: 
Aaron Aaronsohn (1876–1919), agronomist, botanist and Zionist activist; discoverer of the wild precursor of domesticated wheat
Yigal Allon (1918–1980), politician and general
Mosko Alkalai (1931-2008), actor
Richard Wurmbrand (1909-2001), Christian minister, founder of Voice of the Martyrs
Jean Ancel (1940–2008), author and historian specialised in the history of 20th-century Romanian Jewry
Aharon Appelfeld (1932–2018), novelist and Holocaust survivor
Moshe Arad (b. 1934), Israeli diplomat
Uzi Arad (b. 1947), strategist in foreign policy and security
Yardena Arazi (b. 1951), singer and entertainer
Shari Arison (b. 1957), American-born businesswoman and philanthropist, Israel's wealthiest woman
Ted Arison (1924–1999), founder of Carnival Cruise Lines
Shlomo Artzi (b. 1949), singer-songwriter
Asaf Avidan (b. 1980), singer-songwriter and musician
Colette Avital (b. 1940), diplomat and politician
Haim Aviv (b. 1940), molecular biologist
Élie Barnavi (b. 1946), historian and diplomat
Miki Berkovich (b. 1954), professional basketball player
Michaela Bercu (b. 1967), model and actress
Steve Bond (b. 1953), Israeli-American television actor and model
Nancy Brandes (b. 1946), musician and comedian
Rozina Cambos (1951–2012), actress
Yigal Carmon (b. 1946), intelligence officer, counter-terrorism adviser, Middle East analyst
Adrian Dvir, computer scientist and author
Gilad Erdan (b. 1979), politician, member of the Knesset for Likud and the Minister of Public Security, Strategic Affairs and Minister of Information
Miriam Eshkol (1929–2016), wife of Israeli Prime Minister Levi Eshkol
Miriam Feirberg (b. 1951), mayor of Netanya, a city in the Centre District of Israel
Mei Finegold (b. 1982), singer
Oded Gavish (b. 1979), professional football player
Yael German (b. 1947), politician who currently serves as a member of the Knesset for Yesh Atid
Dan Goldstein (b. 1954), pioneer of the Israeli software industry
Amos Guttman (1954–1993), film director 
Zvika Hadar (b. 1966), actor, comedian and television host
Esther Hayut (b. 1953), Chief Justice of the Supreme Court of Israel
Gabriel Herman, professor specialised in ancient Greek social history
Eliahu Itzkovitz, notable for executing the concentration cmp guard who had killed his family 
Marcel Janco (1895–1984), visual artist, architect and art theorist
Yisrael Katz (b. 1955), Likud politician
Avi Kornick (b. 1983), actor
Adi Lev (1953–2006), actress
Yonit Levi (b. 1977), television presenter and journalist
Gita Luka (1921–2001), actress, singer and entertainer 
Sarah Marom-Shalev (b. 1934), politician
Moshe, Mordechai and Menachem Meir, brothers and businessmen who built the Shalom Meir Tower in Tel Aviv
Miss Israel titleholders, chronologically:
Aviva Pe'er, Miss Israel 1954
Atara Barzilay, Miss Israel 1957
Miri Zamir, Miss Israel 1968
Zehava Vardi, Miss Israel 1977
Dana Wexler, Miss Israel 1981
Sapir Koffmann, Miss Israel 1984
Rina Mor (b. 1956), lawyer, writer and beauty queen who won Miss Universe 1976
Tali Moreno (b. 1981), news anchor and reporter
Michael Moshonov (b. 1986), actor, singer, musician and TV host
Meir Nitzan (b. 1932), politician, long-time mayor of Rishon Lezion
Eyal Ofer (b. 1950), real estate and shipping magnate
Idan Ofer (b. 1955), business magnate and philanthropist
Sammy Ofer (1922–2011), shipping magnate and philanthropist
Yuli Ofer (1924–2011), businessman in real estate and industry
Keren Peles (b. 1979), singer-songwriter and pianist
Natalie Portman (b. 1981), actress, producer and director
 Eyal Ran (b. 1972), tennis player and Captain of the Israel Davis Cup team
Zeev Rosenstein - drug dealer
Karol Rotner, professional football player
Reuven Rubin (1893–1974), painter and diplomat
Edmond Schmilovich, football coach
Dudi Sela (b. 1985), professional tennis player
Itay Shechter (b. 1987), professional football player
Idan Vered (b. 1989),  professional football player
Leon Volovici (1938–2011), literary historian and historian, professor of Modern Jewry
Dov Zeltzer (b. 1932), composer and conductor
Margalit Zimmerman and Lily Zimmerman, sisters, both married at some point to Israeli Prime Minister Ariel Sharon
Yisrael Zinger (b. 1948), politician and current mayor of Ramat Gan

Representation in popular culture  
In the teen film Lemon Popsicle, Stella ("A-cumming Stella", portrayed by Ophelia Shtruhl) she is immigrant from Romania and in the Sequel "Going Steady" Tammy (Yvonne Michaels) she is daughter of immigrants from Romania.
The plot of the film The Matchmaker is about Holocaust survivors from Romania who live in Haifa.

See also 

 History of the Jews in Romania
 List of Romanian Jews
 Israel–Romania relations

References 

 
Israeli Jews by national origin